Langur-e Bala (also Romanized as Langūr-e Bālā; also known as Bālā Langūr) is a village in Feyziyeh Rural District, in the Central District of Babol County, Mazandaran Province, Iran. At the 2006 census, its population was 406, in 108 families.

References 

Populated places in Babol County